Rubiteucris is a genus of plants in the family Lamiaceae, first described in 1929. It is native to southern China, the Himalayas, and Myanmar.

Species
 Rubiteucris palmata (Benth. ex Hook.f.) Kudô – Assam, Bhutan, Nepal, Sikkim, Gansu, Guizhou, Hubei, Shaanxi, Sichuan, Taiwan, Tibet, Yunnan 
 Rubiteucris siccanea (W.W.Sm.) P.D.Cantino – Sichuan, Yunnan, Myanmar

References

Lamiaceae
Lamiaceae genera